Dharmendrasinh Vaghela or  Dhambha Dhanala  is an Indian politician who is has served in the Gujarat Legislative Assembly since 2022, representing the Vaghodiya Assembly constituency as an independent. In the 2022 Gujarat Legislative Assembly election, Vaghela was elected with 77,905 votes (42.65%).

Personal life 
He is 55 years old and has a net worth of ₹1.12 billion.

References 

Living people
1950s births

Year of birth uncertain